Clare Rewcastle Brown (born 20 June 1959) is a British environmental and anti-corruption activist, author, blogger and advocate journalist. Born in the former British Crown Colony of Sarawak (now part of Malaysia), she is the founder and operator of the Sarawak Report blog and pirate radio station Radio Free Sarawak which are openly critical of the Barisan Nasional-led state and federal governments of Sarawak and Malaysia. In 2017, her blog Sarawak Report gained wide recognition for its original and early exposure of the 1Malaysia Development Berhad scandal.

Early life, education and career
Rewcastle Brown was born in colonial Sarawak on 20 June 1959 to British parents (before the territory formed a part of Malaysia) and attended a local primary school. Her father was head of special branch in what is Malaysia today when it was still a British colony. Her mother, Karis, was a midwife who helped look after indigenous babies at remote clinics. She moved to the United Kingdom when she was eight, attended private boarding school and subsequently obtained her master's degree in international relations from the London School of Economics. She became a journalist, joining the BBC World Service in 1983.

Clare Rewcastle Brown is married to Andrew Brown, the younger brother of former British Prime Minister Gordon Brown. Andrew was implicated for accepting payments for a cleaner through the Prime Minister's expenses during the expenses scandal in May 2009. In a letter to The Guardian, Rewcastle Brown hit back at the accusations, saying her husband and Gordon were both using the cleaner's services under a "very ordinary" arrangement and sharing the expenses. The Telegraph, the newspaper which ran the story, later acknowledged that Andrew never received any improper benefit.

Sarawak Report and Radio Free Sarawak
During a visit to Sarawak in 2005 to speak at an environment conference, Rewcastle Brown was asked by local journalists and activists to help publicize the deforestation in the state. However, when she began probing into the issue, she became blacklisted from the state and received death threats.

In February 2010, she founded Sarawak Report, a blog seeking to highlight the destruction of Sarawak's tropical rainforests for profit and alleged corruption by the state government led by Chief Minister Abdul Taib Mahmud. Sarawak Report alleges that Taib and his family have profited from the land taken away from Sarawak's indigenous communities and have multiplied their wealth in assets and properties across the world.

In December that year, Rewcastle Brown also set up Radio Free Sarawak to broadcast her findings on the radio to local Sarawakians. Radio Free Sarawak's DJ is Peter John Jaban, who was fired by one of Sarawak's state-controlled radio stations for allowing callers to criticize Taib. Brown met Jaban in 2008 while reporting on a by-election in Sarawak and invited him to become the voice of Radio Free Sarawak in London.

Before February 2011, Sarawak Report and Radio Free Sarawak operated anonymously. However, Rewcastle Brown and Jaban decided to go public after one of her informants, a former Taib aide, was found dead. Ross Boyert, who used to head Taib's supposed real estate arm in the United States, was found dead in a Los Angeles hotel room with a plastic bag around his head in September 2011. Boyert had claimed that he and his family had been harassed since he filed a lawsuit against the real estate company in 2007.

During the period leading up to the April 2011 Sarawak election, Rewcastle Brown said Sarawak Report was forced to constantly switch its address after an onslaught of cyber attacks. She blamed the ruling Barisan Nasional for the disruption. She also claimed that Radio Free Sarawak's signal was jammed by an agent hired to broadcast at the same frequency as the station. Rewcastle Brown worked closely with opposition politicians during the election, including Baru Bian.

Malaysian Deputy Information Communication and Culture Minister Joseph Salang Gandum called Radio Free Sarawak illegal as it was not licensed with the Malaysian Communications and Multimedia Commission. In March 2011, Taib's party, Parti Pesaka Bumiputera Bersatu (PBB), filed a police report against Radio Free Sarawak.

Public relations target
In August 2011, Sarawak Report highlighted the fact that FBC Media, a media production company which produced programs for CNBC and the BBC among others, had been doubling as a public relations firm for Malaysian politicians, including Taib. It alleged that FBC produced shows designed to cover Taib and the state government in a positive light. In light of the revelations, CNBC cancelled World Business, a program produced by FBC, while the BBC suspended all FBC-produced shows from their programming.

Rewcastle Brown had earlier suggested that a PR firm commissioned by Taib had been conducting a "defamation campaign" against her, including hiring journalists from The New Ledger to carry out attacks against her. She also accused the PR firm hired by Taib of creating a "rival" blog, known as Sarawak Reports, to attack her and post "propaganda material promoting Taib," and editing her Wikipedia entry by citing discredited allegations from such attack sites. The "rival" blog has since been taken down while FBC Media went into administration on 24 October 2011.

In December 2011 it emerged that Rewcastle Brown's Wikipedia entry was one of many secretly targeted by PR firm Bell Pottinger.

Media attention
In April 2011, Rewcastle Brown was featured on Australian Broadcasting Corporation (ABC) on the programme "The fight for Sarawak". In December 2011, she was featured on Canadian Global News TV on a programme entitled Family Trees which highlighted the Taib family property company Sakto Corporation in Canada. In September 2012, Rewcastle Brown was featured on AlJazeera's 101 East and SBS Dateline "The Last Frontier" which focused on Australian investment in Sarawak's dam and timber business with links to Taib's cousin Hamed Sepawi.

Entry into Malaysia
Rewcastle Brown was banned from entering Sarawak in July 2013. She arrived at Kuching International Airport in Sarawak, only to be detained at the airport and put back on a plane for Singapore. The former Chief Minister of Sarawak, Abdul Taib Mahmud was known to bar his critics from entering the Sarawak state.

On 1 August 2015, Najib addressed UMNO delegates in Seremban and in a clear reference to the Sarawak Report, demanded that "white people" stay out of Malaysia's affairs. Following a series of exposés by Sarawak Report regarding the 1Malaysia Development Berhad (1MDB) scandal, an arrest warrant was issued by a Malaysian court in August 2015 for Rewcastle Brown. The arrest warrant was obtained for her alleged involvement in "activities detrimental to parliamentary democracy" and the "dissemination of false reports". Responding to the arrest warrant, Rewcastle argued that it is the Malaysian government who is "detrimental to parliamentary democracy" by suppressing free speech (closing down two newspapers) and arresting people who officially engaged in the 1MDB investigations.

On 27 August 2015, in a written reply to Fair Trials International, Interpol clarified that they had rejected the "Red Notice" application from Malaysia on 9 August. Interpol had also written to advise all its 190-member national police forces not to use Interpol's channels in this matter and also requested to remove any data from their national databases.

After the ruling Barisan Nasional was defeated and Pakatan Harapan took power during the 2018 Malaysian general election, the arrest warrant for Clare was lifted and she was able to set foot in Peninsula Malaysia again on 18 May 2018. Sarawak, however, controls its own immigration and did not remove its ban on her entry.

Books 
Clare Rewcastle Brown is also a self-published author of two books which are first-hand accounts of her role in exposing the 1MDB scandal.

 The Sarawak Report (2018) 
 The Wolf Catcher (2019)

References

External links

 Mullany, Gerry. (16 August 2013). "Barred from Malaysia, But Still Connecting with Critical Jabs," The New York Times.
 Clare Rewcastle Brown: THE WORLD'S BIGGEST FINANCIAL SCANDAL, speech at the Oslo Freedom Forum, published on 20 June 2018 on YouTube.

Whistleblowing in Malaysia
British women journalists
British political journalists
Living people
People from Sarawak
Alumni of the London School of Economics
Deforestation
Forestry in Malaysia
1959 births
British environmentalists
British women activists
Environmentalism in Malaysia